Al-Minhaal Academy is an Islamic school located in South Plainfield, New Jersey serving students in pre-kindergarten through twelfth grade. Al-Minhaal Academy also has a full-time masjid.

As of the 2013–14 school year, the school had an enrollment of 285 students (plus 34 in PreK) and 41.0 classroom teachers (on an FTE basis), for a student–teacher ratio of 7.0:1. The school's student body was 96.5% Asian and 3.5% Black.

==References==

External links

2009 establishments in New Jersey
Educational institutions established in 2009
Private elementary schools in New Jersey
Islamic schools in New Jersey
Private middle schools in New Jersey
Private high schools in Middlesex County, New Jersey
South Plainfield, New Jersey